Cafer Hoyuk or Cafer Höyük is an archaeological site located around  northeast of Malatya, Turkey in the Euphrates valley. It was inhabited over ten thousand years ago during the Neolithic revolution.

Construction of the Karakaya Dam has flooded the northeast of the tell mound. Rescue excavations were carried out by the French National Scientific Research Centre (CNRS) under Jacques Cauvin between 1979 and 1986. Finds at the site were dated to the Paleolithic, Pre-Pottery Neolithic, Pottery Neolithic, Early Bronze Age along with a few Medieval finds. Building techniques at the site were seen to be similar to those used at Cayonu with a rectangular mud-brick structures with three rooms called by Cauvin the "cell-plan" phase. Engravings of the shoulders of bulls on the walls of a house were indicative of animalism similar to that found at Çatalhöyük. The first evidence of domesticated cereals appears shortly before this stage. Livestock farming was not evidenced at this level but developed later in the PPNB. Features of the tell mound have been suggested to indicate male and female fertility features. Votive figurines were also found during excavations that were suggested to be male Gods.

The "old period" of the settlement shows a predominant use of flint for tools but in the "middle period" obsidian becomes increasingly prevalent. The "new period" evidences use of around 90% obsidian. Skeletons were also unearthed including those of two children. A skeleton of a pet dog was found evidencing hunting of rabbits along with larger animals in the first stage such as wild boar, roe deer, foxes and other prey. Sheep and goats are both hunted and a very small number of bear and panther bones were also discovered. Findings indicated that larger prey was hunted in later stages.

Wild emmer and einkorn wheat were found in the first layers of excavation. Wheat, barley, lentils and peas were found cultivated along with wild varieties in later levels. Silos for storing grain were also found at these levels. The first layers of the excavations showed evidence of wild emmer and einkorn wheat. It was shown from the findings that these two cereals were taken into cultivation first, followed by the lentils, peas and vetch and afterwards barley. This evidence led Willem van Zeist to suggest that domesticated crops did not enter the area around the Taurus mountains and Northern Syria until the middle of the PPNB.

Cauvin drew detailed designs of the various settlement construction phases and dated the "old period" to the Pre-Pottery Neolithic B with c14 dates of around 8450-7180 BCE. More recent calibrations have pushed the dating of the earliest levels back as far as 8920 BCE.

See also

Cities of the ancient Near East

References

Further reading
 Jacques Cauvin and Oliver Aurenche, Cafer Hoyük et le Néolithique en Anatolia, in Dossiers Histoire et Archéologie 122, 1987, p. 24-25.
 Cauvin, Jacques., Recherches récentes sur la néolithisation de l'Anatolie. les fouilles de Cafer Hôyuk (Malatya) Turcica (Travaux et Recherches en Turquie, I) 71–7., 1982.
 Cauvin, Jacques., Cafer Hoyuk Kazisi 982 yili raporu (en Turc). V Kazi Sonuçlan Toplantisi (Istanbul 23-27 Mayis 1983) 65–66., 1984.
 Cauvin, Jacques., Le Néolithique de Cafer Hoyuk (Turquie), bilan provisoire après quatre campagnes ( 1979-1983). Cahiers de l'Euphrate 4 123–135. 5 fig. Pans Éd. du CNRS., 1985.
 Cauvin, Jacques., Cafer Hôyiik 986. Anatolian Studies 37 1 82- 1 82., 1987.
 Cauvin, Jacques., Les fouilles du village néolithique de Cafer Hôyiik. gue d'Exposition « Anatolie Antique ». Varia Anatolica IV/1 10–13., 1989.
 Cauvin, Jacques., La stratigraphie de Cafer Hôyuk-Est (Turquie) et les origines du PPNB du Taurus. In Aurenche O., Cauvin M.-C. et Sanlanville P. (éd.), Préhistoire du Levant H, Colloque, CNRS, Lyon, mai 1988. Paléorient 15,1 75–86., 1989.
 Cauvin, Jacques., with O. Aurenche., Cafer Hóyiik (Malatya) 1979. lian Studies 30 207–209., 1980.
 Cauvin, Jacques., with O. Aurenche., Premiers sondages sur le siteque de Cafer Hoyiik. In // Kasi Sonuçlan Toplantisi (Ankara février 1980) 175–180., 1980.
 Cauvin, Jacques., with O. Aurenche., Cafer Hoyuk 1980. Anatolian Studies, 31 184–185., 1981.
 Cauvin, Jacques., with O. Aurenche., Cafer Hoyiik 1 980. In Kasiçlan Toplantisi (Ankara) 1, 19-120., 1981.
 Cauvin, Jacques., with O. Aurenche., Le Néolithique de Cafer Hoyuk tya, Turquie. Fouilles 1979–1980. Cahiers de l'Euphrate 3 123–138, 12 fig. Paris Éd. du CNRS., 1982.
 Cauvin, Jacques., with O. Aurenche., Cafer Hôyiik 1983. Anatolian Studies 34, 209–210., 1984.
 Cauvin, Jacques., with O. Aurenche., La campagne de fouilles 1984 à Cafer Hoyiik. VII Kasi Sonuçlan Toplantisi 17–21. 1985
 Cauvin, Jacques., with O. Aurenche, Cafer Hoyuk 1984. Anatolian Studies 35, 183–186., 1985.
 Cauvin, Jacques., with M.-J. Chavanne., et T. Oziol., Le cimetière médiéval de Cafer Hôyiik (Malatya. Turquie). Cahiers de l'Euphrate 4 135–173. 14 fie., 1985.
 Cauvin, Jacques., with O. Aurenche., Cafer Hoyuk 1985. Anatolian Studies 36, 182–184., 1986.
 Cauvin, Jacques., with O. Aurenche., Cafer Hoyiik les fouilles de 1985. VIII Kasi Sonuçlan Toplantisi 39–49., 1986.
 Cauvin, Jacques., with O. Aurenche Cafer Hoyiik et le Néolithique en Anatolie. Dossiers Histoire et Archéologie 122 24–25., 1987a
 Cauvin, Jacques., with M.-C. Cauvin, P. Anderson-Geraud et D. Helvier., Les travaux de 1986-1988 sur le site néolithique pré-céramique de Cafer Hoyiik. Anatolia Antiqua, EskiAnadolu, (1FEA Istanbul XXXII): 4-10. Paris: Maisonneuve., 1991a
 Cauvin, Jacques., with M. Molust., Les niveaux inférieurs de Cafer Hoyiik. Stratigraphie et architectures. Fouilles 84–86. Cahiers de l'Euphrate 5-6 85-1 14. Paris ERC., 1991.
 Cauvin, Jacques. with O. Aurenche, M.-C. Cauvin et N. Balkan-Atli., The Pre-pottery Site of Cafer Hoyiik. In Ôzdoan M. and Basgelen N. (eds). Neolithic in Turkey 87-103 et pi. h. t.., 59-11 Istanbul Arkeoloji ve Sanat Yayinlazi., 1999.

External links
 France Diplomatie - Turkey - Cafer Höyük - The use of obsidian and the Neolithisation of Anatolia
 Cafer Hoyuk on the University of Cologne's Radiocarbon Context Database

Former populated places in Turkey
Geography of Malatya Province
Buildings and structures in Malatya Province
Archaeological sites in Eastern Anatolia
Archaeological sites of prehistoric Anatolia
Bronze Age sites in Asia
Neolithic settlements
Neolithic sites
Paleolithic sites
Pre-Pottery Neolithic B